Pat & Cabbage is a short-lived British sitcom written by Amy Shindler and Beth Chalmers, which first aired in 2013 on ITV. It stars Barbara Flynn and Cherie Lunghi. The series centres on two newly single women who have no intention of growing old gracefully – much to the annoyance of their children.
Series one was six episodes long, and premiered on Thursday 5 September and ended on 10 October 2013 on ITV.

Main cast
Barbara Flynn – Pat
Pat is a widow, who is now ready to have some fun with her single life, along with fellow singleton and best friend, Cabbage. She has a fun personality and a cheeky attitude, despite the fact life keeps throwing obstacles in her (and Cabbages) way. She has two daughters- Helen, the eldest, is driven by her family, whilst Nicola, the youngest, is more driven by her career.
Cherie Lunghi – Cabbage (Jean)
Cabbage is a newly divorced after her husband left her for a younger woman, meaning she finds herself single for the first time in decades. Cabbage's only child, Dylan, is her pride and joy; she still does everything for him even though he is in his forties!
Rosie Cavaliero – Helen
Helen is Pat's eldest daughter, who is married to Jim and the mother of Jack. Helen believes that retraining as a therapist will give her a unique perspective on the personal lives of those around her.
Marcus Garvey – Jim
Jim is the son-in-law of Pat, who is married to Helen and the father of Jack. Jim is a very creative character, who will try any venture to be a success. His never-ending optimism creates fun and sometimes chaos.
Diane Morgan – Nicola
Nicola is the younger daughter of Pat. Despite Pat worrying that she may have left it "too late", Nicola believes that her career as a teacher is more important. She enjoys affectionately taking the mick out of Dylan, with whom she shares some common ground.
Tom Turner – Dylan
Dylan is the only child of Cabbage and is her pride and joy. His mother enables him to live in an environment in which he has to do nothing, including paying rent. 
Luca Fereday/Raffi Fereday – Jack
Jack is the three-year-old son of Helen and Jim. Currently, he is Pat's only grandchild.

Supporting cast
Laura Solon – Ida
Ida is Dylan's girlfriend, who is a pathologist.
Thomas Nelstrop – Toby
Toby is a fellow teacher at Nicola's school whom she is having an affair with. Nicola is upset when Pat tells her that she saw Toby with an underage girl.
Peter Davison – Michael
Michael is a fellow grandparent who meets Pat on a school run. Cabbage attempts to set them up on a date.

Series 1

Ratings
The first episode was watched by 3.20 million viewers and was ranked the 20th most watched programme on ITV of the week. The second episode was watched by 2.77 million viewers and was ranked the 29th most watched programme on ITV of the week. The other 4 episodes were not ranked in the top 30, so their total viewers are not as precise.

References

External links

2013 British television series debuts
2013 British television series endings
2010s British sitcoms
ITV sitcoms
English-language television shows
Television shows set in the United Kingdom